Michael Thompson (born Michael Wood Thompson, February 11, 1954 in Port Washington, New York) is an American guitarist and songwriter.

Thompson is known for his work as a session guitarist during the last 4 decades. He founded the rock group TRW in 2007.

Early years
Michael Thompson grew up in Port Washington, New York and attended Berklee College of Music for two years, studying with Pat Metheny before leaving to tour and record with a local R&B/funk group called The Ellis Hall Group.  After four years with the group, Thompson moved to Los Angeles in the hopes of starting a career as a studio musician, almost immediately getting a touring gig with Joe Cocker. Money was tight and to support himself and his wife Gloria, Thompson supplemented gigs playing on songwriters' publishing demos and sporadic session work with a job as a cab driver until landing a year-long world tour with Cher.

Following the tour, Thompson played guitar for the TV series Fame, a gig he would hold for four years, and started his own band, Slang.  In 1983 he was invited by Andy Fraser, formerly of Free, to be the guitarist on his album Fine Fine Line, for Island Records (1984).

The Michael Thompson Band
In 1988, Thompson finally landed a record deal for an album of his own, with Geffen Records.  The eponymous Michael Thompson Band (also known by its initial logo, MTB), featuring lead vocals by Moon Calhoun, released the album How Long in 1989 and had a Billboard chart hit that year with the single "Can't Miss".  The single hit #33 on the Hot Mainstream Rock Tracks chart. Other musicians on the album included Toto singer Bobby Kimball and ex-Kansas singer John Elefante on background vocals and John Keane, Terry Bozzio (Frank Zappa and Missing Persons) and Pat Torpey (Mr. Big) on drums.

Later work
Thompson played on the eponymous debut album by the commercial fusion act Animal Logic, the brainchild of Police drummer Stewart Copeland and bassist Stanley Clarke.  Thompson shared guitar duties with Peter Haycock (Climax Blues Band) and Steve Howe (Yes, Asia, GTR).  Clarke and Copeland both went on to successful careers composing film scores for which they continued to tap Thompson for guitar work, and he has also worked on film scores by Hans Zimmer, James Newton Howard and Randy Edelman.

Just as Thompson's session career was hitting its stride, 1980s studio guitar staple Dann Huff left L.A. for Nashville and put out the word that producers and contractors who wanted him should instead call Michael Thompson. Thanks to the studio engineer Humberto Gatica's suggestion, Thompson began what would become a decade-long hit-laden association with producer/songwriter David Foster, including a number of Celine Dion records, beginning with "The Power of Love". It was during another Dion session for Foster in 1995 that R&B singer/songwriter/producer Babyface heard him through the wall of the studio and invited him to play on the project he was there for, the #1 Waiting to Exhale: Original Soundtrack Album for Whitney Houston. Babyface, too, would frequently use Thompson throughout the 1990s, including on the huge hit "Change the World" with Eric Clapton and Babyface's own hit single, "Every Time I Close My Eyes".  Thompson was in Babyface's live band for the MTV special, album and DVD Babyface: MTV Unplugged NYC 1997.

Quincy Jones invited Thompson to be a guest on his 1995 album Q's Jook Joint.  The following year Thompson released his first solo album, The World According to M.T.  The album featured compositions by Thompson; a collaboration with Jeff Paris, who had guested on How Long; and a song written by another How Long collaborator, Mark Spiro.  A cover of a Sam Cooke song, "A Change is Gonna Come", featuring Bobby Womack on vocals, peaked at #2 on the Billboard Bubbling Under R&B/Hip-Hop Singles.

Thompson's abilities and sensibilities are so trusted that BT magazine noted in its 2001 "Platinum Touch" cover story on Thompson that "These days, many artists and producers just drop their tapes off at Thompson's home studio and let him add whatever he wants.  It is a convenient, low-pressure way to work, but Thompson says he still loves to interact with other musicians at the big studios."

In 2001 Thompson was awarded the "Distinguished Alumni" award from his alma mater Berklee College of Music to commemorate his contributions to the music industry.  Berklee's program for the event noted that "he is widely regarded as being among the elite studio session players, and his list of credits includes such prominent names as Michael Jackson, Whitney Houston, Celine Dion, 'N Sync, Toni Braxton, Phil Collins, Rod Stewart, Joe Sample, the Scorpions, Vince Neil, Christina Aguilera, Michael Bolton, Thalía, Mariah Carey, Bette Midler, Madonna, BabyFace, En Vogue, Gloria Estefan, Stanley Clarke, and Ricky Martin."

Robert John "Mutt" Lange worked with Thompson on Shania Twain's album Up! (2003). Here Mutt and Twain flew down to Milano to collaborate, as Thompson was working on recording with an Italian artist at the time. According to Thompson he first played on 7 tracks in Italy, and later Mutt asked him to come to Hawaii to play on most of the remaining tracks as well.

In 2007, Thompson revisited his late-1980s melodic rock heyday with two projects.  He recorded three new songs for a remastered re-release of Michael Thompson Band's How Long, released in the summer of that year.  He also formed a new band, TRW, with Mark Williamson on vocals and bass and John Robinson on drums.  The group released the album Rivers of Paradise (2007).

Discography
Solo
 The World According to M.T. (1998)
 M.T. Speaks (2005)
Michael Thompson Band
 How Long (1989)
 How Long (2007, Remastered with 3 Bonus Tracks)
 Future Past (2012)
 Love & Beyond (2019)
 High Times - Live In Italy (2020, Live CD/DVD)
TRW (Thompson, Robinson, Williamson)
 Rivers of Paradise (2007)

Selected session discography
 Cher (1987) Cher
 Till I Loved You (1988) Barbra Streisand
 Not Me (1988) Glenn Medeiros
 Heart of Stone (1989) Cher
 Good to Be Back (1989) Natalie Cole
 Bowling in Paris (1989) Stephen Bishop
 Somebody Loves You (1989) Paul Anka
 The Simpsons Sing the Blues (1990) The Simpsons
 Kiss Me with the Wind (1990) Brenda Russell
 For My Broken Heart (1991) Reba McEntire
 Love Hurts (1991) Cher
 Lovescape (1991) Neil Diamond
 Time, Love & Tenderness (1991) Michael Bolton
 Celine Dion (1992) Céline Dion
 Jennifer Rush (1992) Jennifer Rush
 Timeless: The Classics (1992) Michael Bolton
 Breathless (1992) Kenny G
 Start the Car (1992) Jude Cole
 The Colour of My Love (1993) Céline Dion
 Back to Broadway (1993) Barbra Streisand
 The One Thing (1993) Michael Bolton
 Soul Talkin''' (1993) Brenda Russell
 Have a Little Faith (1994) Joe Cocker
 Window (1994) Christopher Cross
 Rhythm of Love (1994) Anita Baker
 The Christmas Album, Volume II (1994) Neil Diamond
 Groove On (1994) Gerald LeVert
 Through the Fire (1994) Peabo Bryson
 Something To Remember (1995) Madonna
 Waiting to Exhale (1995) Various
 A Very Fine Love (1995) Dusty Springfield
 HIStory: Past, Present and Future, Book I (1995) Michael Jackson
 Out of My Hands (1995) Jennifer Rush
 It's a Mystery (1995) Bob Seger
 Falling Into You (1996) Céline Dion
 Sweet 19 Blues (1996) Namie Amuro
 For You I Will (1996) Monica
 Secrets (1996) Toni Braxton
 Every Time I Close My Eyes (1996) Babyface
 Blood on the Dance Floor: HIStory in the Mix (1997) Michael Jackson
 Flame (1997) Patti LaBelle
 Cowgirl Dreamin (1997) Yumi Matsutoya
 Concentration 20 (1997) Namie Amuro
 Butterfly (1997) Mariah Carey
 Open Road (1997) Gary Barlow
 Let's Talk About Love (1997) Céline Dion
 Deborah (1997) Debbie Gibson
 Flesh and Bone (1997) Richard Marx
 Freedom (1997) Sheena Easton
 Eden (1998) Sarah Brightman
 Greg Bissonette (1998) Greg Bissonette
 ...Hits (1998) Phil Collins
 Bathhouse Betty (1998) Bette Midler
 A Body of Work (1998) Paul Anka
 Back with a Heart (1998) Olivia Newton-John
 Jennifer Paige (1998) Jennifer Paige
 Keep the Faith (1998) Faith Evans
 These Are Special Times (1998) Céline Dion
 Affirmation (1999) Savage Garden
 Christina Aguilera (1999) Christina Aguilera
 Timeless: The Classics Vol. 2 (1999) Michael Bolton
 Short Stories (2000) Miyuki Nakajima
 Days in Avalon (2000) Richard Marx
 Friends for Schuur (2000) Diane Schuur
 You, Too Cool (2001) Eikichi Yazawa
 Christmas Memories (2001) Barbra Streisand
 Invincible (2001) Michael Jackson
 Enchantment (2001) Charlotte Church
 Snowflakes (2001) Toni Braxton
 Josh Groban (2001) Josh Groban
 Up! (2002) Shania Twain
 Only a Woman Like You (2002) Michael Bolton
 Twisted Angel (2002) LeAnn Rimes
 Cry (2002) Faith Hill
 A New Day Has Come (2002) Céline Dion
 Couldn't Have Said It Better (2003) Meat Loaf
 Michael Bublé (2003) Michael Bublé
 Closer (2003) Josh Groban
 Genius Loves Company (2004) Ray Charles
 What a Wonderful World (2004) LeAnn Rimes
 Motown Two (2004) Michael McDonald
 My Own Best Enemy (2004) Richard Marx
 It's Time (2005) Michael Bublé
 Classic Moments (2005) Patti LaBelle
 A Little Soul in Your Heart (2005) Lulu
 Lullaby Singer (2006) Miyuki Nakajima
 Givin' It Up (2006) George Benson, Al Jarreau
 Awake (2006) Josh Groban
 Taking Chances (2007) Céline Dion
 East of Angel Town (2007) Peter Cincotti
 Family (2007) LeAnn Rimes
 Seal (2008) Seal
 Emotional Remains (2008) Richard Marx
 Soul Speak (2008) Michael McDonald
 Christmas (2008) Al Jarreau
 Sundown (2008) Richard Marx
 Crazy Love (2009) Michael Bublé
 One World One Love (2009) Michael Bolton
 Primera Fila (2009) Thalía
 After Hours (2012) Glenn Frey
 Loved Me Back to Life (2013) Céline Dion
 A Volte Esagero (2014) Gianluca Grignani
 Man on the Rocks (2014) Mike Oldfield
 Tracks of My Years (2014) Bryan Adams
 Beautiful Goodbye (2014) Richard Marx
 Wallflower (2015) Diana Krall
 Electropop (2016) Miguel Mateos
 Encore un soir (2016) Céline Dion
 Love (2018) Michael Bublé

Selected film and TV scores
 Fame (1982–1987)
 Miami Vice (1989–1990)
 Tiny Toon Adventures (1990-1991)
 Days of Thunder (1990) Hans Zimmer (Additional only)
 Melrose Place (1992-1999)
 California Dreams (1992-1994)
 Animaniacs (1993-1998)
 Cool Runnings (1993) Hans Zimmer
 What's Love Got to Do with It (1993) Stanley Clarke
 I'll Do Anything (1994) Hans Zimmer
 Renaissance Man (1994) Hans Zimmer
 Heat (1995) Elliot Goldenthal
 The Rock (1996) Hans Zimmer
 The Preacher's Wife (1996) Hans Zimmer
 Space Jam (1996) James Newton Howard
 Primal Fear (1996) James Newton Howard
 Daylight (1996) Randy Edelman
 Home Alone 3 (1997) Nick Glennie-Smith
 G.I. Jane (1997) Trevor Jones
 Chill Factor (1999) Hans Zimmer
 Romeo Must Die (2000) Stanley Clarke
 Gideon's Crossing (2000) James Newton Howard
 Big Trouble (2002) James Newton Howard
 Hairspray (2007) Marc Shaiman

References

External links
[  Michael Thompson at AllMusic]

1954 births
Living people
American session musicians
People from Port Washington, New York
Guitarists from New York (state)
Berklee College of Music alumni
20th-century American guitarists
21st-century American guitarists
Geffen Records artists
Frontiers Records artists